Constantin Cândea (December 15, 1887 – March 4, 1971) was a Romanian chemist, Professor of Chemistry, Ph.D. Engineer and later Rector at the Polytechnic University of Timișoara – formerly the Polytechnic School of Timișoara between 1946 and 1947.

Life
Constantin Cândea graduated from Prince Ferdinand High School in Bacău in 1907, and in 1911 from Königlich Bayerische Technische Hochschule München, now Technical University Munich.

He was married to Maria (Antoniade) Cândea (October 2, 1889, Galați - April, 16, 1974, Bucharest), teacher of French with higher education and Doctor of Letters in France, who founded and led as headmistress the High School of Pedagogy for Girls ″Queen Marie″ (now National College of Pedagogy ″Queen Marie″) in Ploiești.

In the first year of activity of the Polytechnic School of Timișoara initiated by the Royal Decree No. 4822 of November 11, 1920 of King Ferdinand, Professor Ph.D. Eng. Constantin Cândea created the Chemistry Laboratory and Professor Ph.D. Eng. Constantin Stăncescu initiated the Physics Laboratory.

He was Corresponding Member of the Romanian Academy of Sciences since December 21, 1935 and Full Member since December 20, 1936.

He was Rector of The Polytechnic University of Timișoara - formerly Polytechnic School of Timișoara between 1946 and 1947.

He died at the age of 83 and was buried in the Bellu cemetery, figure 4, in Bucharest.

Work
Constantin Cândea has published numerous works, including:
Separation of copper group metals (Analytical and Bioanalytical Chemistry, vol.96, no.7, pp. 276–276, 1934)
 Separation of the acidic sulfides of the other compounds of the sulphide precipitation (Fresenius Journal of Analytical Chemistry, vol.97, no.3, pp. 118–118, 1934)
Separation of the acidic sulfides of the other compounds of the sulphide precipitation (Analytical and Bioanalytical Chemistry, vol.97, no.3-4, pp. 118–118, 1934)
Lead (Analytical and Bioanalytical Chemistry, vol.110, no.5, pp. 206–208, 1937)
Qualitative analysis (Analytical and Bioanalytical Chemistry, vol.108, no.9, pp. 340–345, 1939)
Fuels and petroleum based fuels (Analytical and Bioanalytical Chemistry, vol.118, no.5, pp. 208–222, 1939)
Methane in connection with national defense  (Bulletin of the Academy of Sciences of Romania No. 10, 1942)
Condensation of oxibenzaldehyde and nitrobenzaldehyde with 2.7 dinitrofluorura (European Journal of Inorganic Chemistry, vol.75, no.12, pp. 2017–2018, 1942)
Organic nitrogen compounds (Analytical and Bioanalytical Chemistry), vol.125, no.1, pp. 48–57, 1943
The reaction of methane with zinc chloride Angewandte Chemie, vol.56, no. 35–36, pp. 247–248, 1943

External links
  Timișoara during soviet military  occupation (Timișoara City Hall Monitor)
  Dr. Mircea Rusnac, Student protest movements of Timișoara before 1956

References

20th-century chemists
Romanian chemists
Technical University of Munich alumni
Academic staff of the Politehnica University of Timișoara
Rectors of Politehnica University of Timișoara
People from Bacău County
1887 births
1971 deaths
Burials at Bellu Cemetery
Members of the Romanian Academy of Sciences